Klay Shroedel (born May 9, 1966 in Bayreuth, Germany) is a German–American musician, music producer, and film producer.  He is the CEO of West Coast Film Partners.

Early life
Shroedel took to music at an early age studying drums and piano, as well as musical composition. He has a B.S. degree in economics, M.A. in music, and associate's degree in psychology.

Career
Shroedel started as a studio and touring musician as well as a music conductor and orchestrator.  He is known for working with many top recording artists, including Michael Jackson, Seal, Michael Sembello, Celine Dion and Frank Sinatra. He also produced the Baywatch theme song "I'm Always Here" for Jimi Jamison, lead singer of Survivor. Shroedel has worked on over 60 motion picture projects including Titanic, Batman Returns, Independence Day and Terminator 3: Rise of the Machines.

He has negotiated and managed licensing agreements for the motion pictures:
 Wishmaster
 Wishmaster 2: Evil Never Dies
 Wishmaster 3: Beyond the Gates of Hell
 The Substitute 2: School's Out
 The Substitute 3: Winner Takes All
 Permanent Midnight
 Belly
 Candyman: Day of the Dead
 Suicide Kings

Internationally he has successfully implemented master use, sync, broadcast, licensing and buy-out agreements for various entertainment based properties in Japan, China, the UK, France, Italy and Russia.

Shroedel is currently financing and producing feature films. Furthermore, he has co-written, performed and produced all music for the musical extravaganza Uprising – the Musical, together with Bobby Hart and songwriter Barry Richards.

Discography
As writer and or producer:
 Icon – Red Satyr
 Empires – Jimi Jamison (as "Jimi Jamison's Survivor")
 "I'm Always Here" – Soundtrack of Baywatch
 Under Suspicion – Under Suspicion
 Tana – Tana
 The Road Studio Across America – television
 "Keep It Evergreen" – Jimi Jamison’s Survivor (unreleased)

Personal
Shroedel has resided in Hollywood, California, since 1986.

References

1966 births
Place of birth missing (living people)
Living people
American film producers
American record producers